Dieter Fox is a German-American roboticist and a Professor in the Department of Computer Science & Engineering at the University of Washington, Seattle. He received his PhD in Computer Science at the University of Bonn in 1998. He is most notable for his contributions to several fields including robotics, artificial intelligence, machine learning, and ubiquitous computing. Together with Wolfram Burgard and Sebastian Thrun he is a co-author of the book Probabilistic Robotics.

References

External links
 Home page

1966 births
Living people
German roboticists
German computer scientists
Artificial intelligence researchers
University of Bonn alumni
University of Washington faculty